Obiora Uzochukwu  is the Anglican Bishop of Mbamili in the Niger Province of the Church of Nigeria.

He was elected as Bishop in January 2021. Uzochukwu, who is from Isulo, Orumba South, Anambra, had previously served at St. John's Anglican Church in Umueze, Anambra West, before becoming Vicar and Canon of St. Faith Church, Onitsha.

He was Archdeacon of All Saints Cathedral, Onitsha, from 2014 until 2021.

References 

Anglican bishops of Mbamili
21st-century Anglican bishops in Nigeria
People from Anambra State
Church of Nigeria archdeacons
Year of birth missing (living people)
Living people